Diva, formerly Diva Universal, is a woman-based entertainment channel owned by Universal Networks International.

The list of Diva channels includes:
Diva (Asia TV channel) defunct
Diva Universal (Philippines) defunct
Diva Universal (Bulgaria) defunct
Diva Universal (Italy) defunct
Diva (Romania) currently
Diva Universal (Russia) defunct
Diva (Adria) (Serbia/Croatia/Slovenia) currently

See also
Syfy Universal
13th Street Universal
Universal Channel
Studio Universal
Diva TV
Hallmark Channel (International)
Hallmark Channel

NBCUniversal networks
Women's interest channels